Lajjaavathi is a 1979 Indian Malayalam film, directed by G. Premkumar. The film stars Krishnachandran, Ambika, Baby Sumathi and K. A. Sivadas in the lead roles. The film has musical score by KJ Joy.

Cast
 
Krishnachandran 
Ambika 
Baby Sumathi 
K. A. Sivadas 
Raghavan 
James Stalin 
Stanley
Kollam G. K. Pillai 
Sreelatha Namboothiri 
Aranmula Ponnamma 
Nellikode Bhaskaran 
Vincent

Soundtrack
The music was composed by K. J. Joy and the lyrics were written by Anwar Suber.

References

External links
  
 

1979 films
1970s Malayalam-language films